Dorsa Sorby is a wrinkle ridge system at  in Mare Serenitatis on the Moon. It is 76 km long and was named after British geologist Henry Clifton Sorby in 1976.

References

External links
LAC-42
Dorsa Sorby at The Moon Wiki

Ridges on the Moon
Mare Serenitatis